Żabie  is a settlement in the administrative district of Gmina Golczewo, within Kamień County, West Pomeranian Voivodeship, in north-western Poland.

References

Villages in Kamień County